Abul Hossain Tarun is a Bangladesh Awami League politician and the former Member of Parliament of Kushtia-4. His father, Mohammad Golam Kibria, was a member of Parliament.

Career
Tarun was elected to parliament from Kushtia-4 as a Bangladesh Awami League candidate in 1986.

Death
Tarun died in 1997.

References

Awami League politicians
1997 deaths
3rd Jatiya Sangsad members